Phytologia is an open-access journal to expedite plant systematics, phytogeographical and ecological publication, focused on North America. Its mode of subscription is by sending e-mail to the editor. It has been available online since 2013.

It is edited by Robert P. Adams and others.

References

External links
 

English-language journals
Botany journals